The Levenger Tapes is a 2011 American horror-thriller film written and directed by Mark Edwin Robinson. The film premiered at the Temecula Valley International Film Festival in September 2011 and will be distributed by New Films International.

Plot
After three college students go missing, detectives discover a disturbing tape that they hope will provide clues to their whereabouts. The footage of the students takes a chilling turn when they discover the bloodied dress of a young girl in the wilderness. The detectives link the missing students case and the young girl together and hope to find them all alive.

Cast
Johanna Braddy as Amanda
Lili Mirojnick as Kim
Morgan Krantz as Chase
Chris Mulkey as Stackman
Tom Virtue as Gallagher
Maria Olsen as Screaming Lady
John Rosenfeld as Rooney

References

External links
 

2011 films
2011 independent films
American horror thriller films
American independent films
2011 horror thriller films
Films directed by Mark Edwin Robinson
2010s English-language films
2010s American films